Softcore (stylized as softCORE) is the debut album by American singer and songwriter Fousheé. It was released on November 17, 2022, through RCA.

Singles and promotion
On May 20, 2022, the first single, "I'm Fine", was released alongside the music video. On September 29, 2022, Fousheé released a visualizer for "Simmer Down". On October 28, 2022, Fousheé released the second single "Supernova" alongside the music video. On November 15, 2022, Fousheé released the third visual "Simulation". On November 18, 2022, Fousheé released the fourth visual, "Spend the Money", featuring Lil Uzi Vert.

Critical reception

Jem Aswad for Variety wrote, "Softcore is a jarring blast of melody and chaos that adds up to one of the year's best and most exciting albums."

Track listing

Notes
 All tracks are stylized in lowercase.
  signifies an additional producer.
  signifies an assistant producer.

Personnel 

 Dale Becker – mastering (tracks 1, 3–12)
 Jeff Ellis – mixing (1, 3–12)
 Jaycen Joshua – mastering, mixing (2)
 Spencer Dennis – engineering (1, 4, 5, 7, 9, 10, 12)
 Zach Fogarty – engineering (1)
 Hank Byerly – engineering (2)
 Solomonophonic – engineering (3)
 Rob Bisel – engineering (4)
 Dane McQuillan – engineering (6)
 Hope Brush – engineering (8)
 JC Chiam – engineering (10)
 Bnyx – engineering (11)
 Fili Filizzola – engineering assistance (1, 4–8, 10–12)
 Ivan Handwerk – engineering assistance (1, 3–12)
 Katie Harvey – engineering assistance (1, 4–8, 10–12)
 Noah McCorkle – engineering assistance (1, 3, 5–12)
 Trevor Taylor – engineering assistance (1, 3, 4–12)
 DJ Riggins – engineering assistance (2)
 Jacob Richards – engineering assistance (2)
 Mike Seaberg – engineering assistance (2)
 Chris Woods – strings (10)

References

2022 debut albums